Côté or Coté is a surname. Notable people with the surname include:

Alain Côté (ice hockey b. 1957), (born 1957) Canadian ice hockey player
Alain Côté (ice hockey b. 1967), (born 1967) Canadian ice hockey player
Alcide Côté (1903–1955), Canadian politician and Postmaster General
Dimitri Nana-Côté, Canadian drag queen
Ernest Côté (1913-2015), Canadian soldier, diplomat and civil servant.
David Côté (politician) (1915–1969), Canadian politician
Gérard Côté (1913–1993), Canadian marathon runner
Gisèle Côté-Harper (born 1942), Canadian lawyer and professor
Guy Côté (born 1965), Canadian politician
Héliodore Côté (born 1934), Canadian politician
Héloïse Côté (born 1979), Canadian writer
Isabelle M. Côté, Canadian ecologist
Jacques Côté (born 1944), Canadian politician
Jean Côté (1867–1924), Canadian politician
Jean-Philippe Côté (born 1982), Canadian ice hockey player
Jean-Pierre Côté (1926–2002) Canadian politician and Landscape painter
Marc Aurèle de Foy Suzor-Coté (1869–1937), Canadian painter and sculptor
Michel Côté (born 1942), Canadian politician and member of the House of Commons
Michel Côté (MNA) (born 1937), Quebec politician and Member of the National Assembly
Michel Côté (actor) (born 1950), Canadian actor
Patrick Côté (fighter) (born 1980), Canadian mixed martial arts fighter
Patrick Côté (ice hockey) (born 1975), Canadian ice hockey player
Paul Côté (1944–2013), Canadian sailor
Pierre F. Côté (1927–2013), Canadian civil servant and lawyer
Roger Côté (1939–2020), Canadian ice hockey player
Suzanne Côté (born 1958), Canadian Supreme Court justice
Sylvain Côté, Canadian NHL player

See also
Cote (surname)

French-language surnames